New York State Route 101 (NY 101) is a  long state highway in northwestern Nassau County, New York, in the United States. It runs north–south as Port Washington Boulevard from NY 25A in Flower Hill, west of Roslyn and east of Manhasset, to Astor Lane in Sands Point. It becomes County Route 101 (CR 101) south along Searingtown Road to Shelter Rock Road (CR 8) and becomes Middle Neck Road (CR D55) north of Astor Lane, continuing north and west to a dead end at Long Island Sound as the unsigned County Route D55 (CR D55).

NY 101 was assigned  while the county route continuations were assigned in 1958. CR 101 was initially signed; however, signage for the route was removed in 1973. In the 1950s and 1960s, a proposal was made to construct an expressway in western Nassau County. The Western Nassau Expressway, as it was known, would have extended from NY 27 to NY 101 and utilized the NY 101 corridor north of NY 25A. The proposal was shelved in the 1970s.

Route description

CR 101
CR 101 begins at an intersection with Shelter Rock Road (CR 8) and Herricks Road near Herricks High School. The route heads eastward as Searingtown Road, passing to the south of the high school and to the north of a small pond. One block east of Herricks Road, CR 101 intersects with Old Searingtown Road, a former alignment of the current CR 101 alignment. At this point, the highway curves to the northeast and passes through a small area of trees nestled amongst a large, residential area bordering Williston Park. Old Searingtown Road rejoins CR 101 at the northern edge of the forested area.

The route continues north, serving as the boundary between Searingtown and Albertson as it proceeds past side streets lined by homes. At I.U. Willets Road, CR 101 serves the Henry Viscardi School and enters Searingtown. Just inside of the community, CR 101 intersects Hilldale Drive and Dogwood Road, two local streets connecting to Herricks Middle School. The route continues on through Searingtown into the village of North Hills, where the homes give way to trees as it turns to the northeast and passes under the Northern State Parkway. A short distance after the Northern Parkway overpass, CR 101 meets the Long Island Expressway (Interstate 495) by way of Nassau Boulevard—the southern service road—and North Service Road.

North of the Long Island Expressway, CR 101 passes by Christopher Morley Park to the east and residential neighborhoods to the west. Past the park, CR 101 enters an area with more residential development as it begins to run along the western boundary of Roslyn Estates and the eastern edge of Manhasset. The homes give way to commercial developments as the highway approaches Flower Hill and NY 25A (Northern Boulevard). Searingtown Road becomes Port Washington Boulevard and CR 101 becomes NY 101 upon intersecting NY 25A.

NY 101
NY 101 continues north from NY 25A as a four-lane, undivided highway, passing homes, businesses, and small patches of trees situated near the junction with NY 25A. At an intersection with Park Avenue North, NY 101 becomes a divided highway with two lanes in each direction. The highway continues north through Flower Hill to St. Francis Hospital, where it curves to the northwest to serve the center of Flower Hill. Here, NY 101 passes east of the Flower Hill Village Park and west of the North Hempstead Country Club, before curving back to the north and entering Port Washington.

In Port Washington, NY 101 passes Nassau Knolls Cemetery and narrows to become a four-lane undivided highway as it enters the center of the hamlet. It proceeds north–south through downtown, passing several blocks of commercial buildings and Paul D. Schreiber Senior High School ahead of a junction with Main Street. North of this point, the surroundings of NY 101 become more residential as the route narrows to two lanes and passes into the village of Sands Point. NY 101 ends shortly afterward at an intersection with Astor Lane, at which point Port Washington Boulevard is continued by Middle Neck Road and designated as CR 101.

North of Astor Lane (CR D55)

North of Astor Lane, the road becomes Middle Neck Road (CR D55) and heads northward, passing local residences and local commercial buildings to the west and the Village Club of Sands Point to the east. North of the club, the highway curves to the northwest and becomes surrounded by several blocks of residential homes to the southwest and patches of trees to the northeast as it heads deeper into the village.

From this point west to the highway's end on Long Island Sound, CR D55 follows a mostly east–west alignment through Sands Point. Along this last stretch, the route passes to the south of Sands Point County Park and north past Sands Point Golf Club as the surroundings around the route become increasingly forested and undeveloped. At Tibbits Lane, the route turns to the northwest and continues to the road's end at a dead end on the southern shore of Long Island Sound.

History
In the 1930 renumbering of state highways in New York, several of the routes assigned during the 1920s were renumbered or modified. At the same time, hundreds of state-maintained highways that did not yet have a route number were assigned one. One of these highways was Port Washington Boulevard, a roadway connecting NY 25A (Northern Boulevard) in Flower Hill to Astor Lane in Sands Point, which was designated as NY 101 by the following year.

1950s improvement project 
In the late 1950s, the New York State Department of Public Works modernized NY 101 in a $1,690,000 (1958 USD) improvement project. This project, which began in early 1957, saw the widening of Port Washington Boulevard – most notably the 1.5-mile (2.4 km) part running through Flower Hill, and was carried out by a private firm contracted by the Department of Public Works. Many people residing in Flower Hill and other surrounding communities were concerned by these improvements, in part due to the number of trees that were removed to accommodate the widened roadway, and the fact that the state did not immediately commit to replanting greenery and restoring the landscape. The state also did not immediately compensate the Village of Flower Hill for the property acquired through eminent domain, and the grades of several intersections in Flower Hill being engineered to have unusually steep angles, with the intersecting, residential roads being significantly lower than the improved Port Washington Boulevard. Furthermore, the roadway was also cited by local residents and officials as being engineered to carry traffic at speeds significantly higher than Flower Hill's then-standard, 30-mph (48 km/h) speed limit.

These issues prompted Harold S. Shouse, the Mayor of Flower Hill, to cite the road as being "poorly engineered", and that the "road has been engineered for 70-mph and the present speed limit is 30-mph."

The state ultimately pledged to restore the landscaping and announced that they would adjust the grade of the intersections if prompted to do so by Flower Hill's officials.

CR 101 designated (1959) 
In 1959, the Nassau County Department of Public Works created a numbered highway system as part of their "Master Plan" for the county highway system. This plan marked CR 101 along its current alignment.

Cancelled Western Nassau Expressway 
In the early 1950s, the New York State Department of Public Works laid out plans for a six-lane expressway in western Nassau County. The proposed highway, known as the Freeport–Roslyn Expressway would begin at Atlantic Avenue in Freeport and head north to an intersection with NY 25A (Northern Boulevard) in Roslyn, and would have been designated NY-101. Local residents, however, opposed the plan, stating that the area was being developed too quickly. The proposed expressway was cancelled, and the $45 million that would have been used for the  expressway went to extending the Meadowbrook State Parkway northward instead.

Although these original plans was shelved, the need for a highway in western Nassau County still existed. In 1963, the Department of Public Works revived the project; however, the routing was altered to extend from the Sunrise Highway (NY 27) north to an intersection with CR 101 (Middle Neck Road) in Sands Point. Part of the route would use modern NY 101 and the right-of-way of an abandoned Long Island Rail Road line. In 1971, several proposed crossings of the Long Island Sound were studied. One crossing, a bridge connecting Sands Point to New Rochelle to Westchester County, may have become a northward extension of the highway if it was constructed. By 1971, though, hopes had begun to fade on the highway's prospects of becoming reality. Even if construction had begun in that year, the highway would not be open to traffic until 1975. The project was eventually shelved.

Modern history (2005–present) 
Since 2005, the traffic counts contained within the annual New York State Department of Transportation (NYSDOT) Traffic Data Report have indicated that the northern terminus of NY 101 is at an intersection with Beacon Hill Road. However, other documents produced by NYSDOT, such as their official description of routes in New York, give the highway's northern terminus as Astors Lane.

In 2014, as part of a project to improve electricity transmission in the area, PSEG Long Island erected a new power line between Great Neck and Port Washington. The routing follows Port Washington Boulevard through the area, and was controversial due to the height of the poles.

In November 2017, the portion of NY 101 between Northern Boulevard and Crabapple Road was dedicated and renamed to Sergeant James J. Regan Memorial Boulevard, after the late U.S. Army Ranger Sergeant James J. Regan, in efforts made by New York State Senator Elaine Phillips. Regan, a Purple Heart recipient from Manhasset, perished on active duty in Northern Iraq on February 9, 2007, when the vehicle that he was in was targeted by an IED.

Starting in 2019 after several years of complaints from local and state officials, and from residents of communities along the route, NYSDOT repaved the entirety of Port Washington Boulevard from Northern Boulevard to Harbor Road. This project was completed in 2020.

Former CR 101A 

CR 101A was a designation for the  portion of Middle Neck Road between NY 25A and NY 101. The highway was a spur of CR 101 in name only as it never connected to CR 101.

In 2022, the Incorporated Village of Flower Hill took ownership of this road in a deal with Nassau County, acquiring the road for $1.

Major intersections

See also

List of county routes in Nassau County, New York

References

External links

NY 101 (Greater New York Roads)

101
Transportation in Nassau County, New York
Roads on Long Island